Ba'ath Party (1947–1966) is a pan-Arab political party.

Ba'ath Party may also refer to:

Arab Ba'ath Movement (1940–1947)
Arab Ba'ath (1940–1947)
Arab Socialist Ba'ath Party – Syria Region (1947–present)
Arab Socialist Ba'ath Party – Yemen Region (1947–1966)
Arab Socialist Ba'ath Party – Iraq Region (1948–2003)
Arab Socialist Ba'ath Party – Lebanon Region (1966–present)
Ba'ath Party (Iraqi-dominated faction) (1966–present)
Ba'ath Party (Syrian-dominated faction) (1966–present)
Democratic Socialist Arab Ba'ath Party (Syria) (1970–present)
Arab Socialist Ba'ath Party – Region of Sudan (founded 1970)
Arab Socialist Ba'ath Party – Organization of Sudan (1980–present)
Sudanese Ba'ath Party (2002–present)